In the mathematical field of graph theory, the Meringer graph is a 5-regular undirected graph with 30 vertices and 75 edges named after Markus Meringer.

It is one of the four (5,5)-cage graphs, the others being the Foster cage, the Robertson–Wegner graph, and the Wong graph.

It has chromatic number 3, diameter 3, and is 5-vertex-connected.

Algebraic properties
The characteristic polynomial of the Meringer graph is

References 

Individual graphs
Regular graphs